The 2013 Tamarua by-election was a by-election in the Cook Islands electorate of Tamarua. It was held on 29 January 2013, and was precipitated by the death of sitting MP Pukeiti Pukeiti.

The by-election was won by the Democratic Party's Tetangi Matapo.

References

By-elections in the Cook Islands
2013 elections in Oceania
2013 in the Cook Islands